Maroona is the junction station between what is the main western railway line and the branch line to Portland, Victoria, Australia. A number of sidings are provided at this station which are still in use. The platform and station building remain at Maroona with track access still available to one side of the platform.

References
Vicrail Maroona
Vicsig Maroona

Disused railway stations in Victoria (Australia)